Alla mia età is the fourth studio album by pop singer Tiziano Ferro. It was released in May 2009 and became Ferro's third #1 album in his native Italy. A Spanish-language version of the album was also released, titled A mi edad. The first single from the album was the title track "Alla mia età", which went to top the Italian Singles Chart.

Album information 
The album was recorded in Milan and London between 2007 and 2008.

Ferro included many collaborations in this project: he collaborated with Italian musician Franco Battiato in the song "Il tempo stesso", with American singer Kelly Rowland in the song "Breathe Gentle" and with Mexican singers Anahí and Dulce María from Latin pop group RBD in the song "El regalo más grande". For the album's release in Spain this last song was made into a duet with Amaia Montero.
Furthermore, in an interview in Mexico Ferro declared that fellow Italian pop singer Laura Pausini co-wrote the song "La paura non-esiste" ("El miedo no existe").

Track listing

A mi edad – Track listing

Release history

Charts

Weekly charts

Year-end charts

Certifications and sales

References

External links 
 Tiziano Ferro official website
 

Tiziano Ferro albums
2009 albums
Albums produced by Michele Canova